Bergstrom or Bergström is a Swedish surname. It derives from the Swedish words berg meaning mountain and ström meaning stream and may refer to:

Notable people
 Alexander Bergström (born 1986), Swedish professional ice hockeyer
 Alfred Bergström (1869–1930), Swedish artist and art professor
 Anders Bergström (cross-country skier) (born 1968), Swedish cross-country skier
 Anders Bergström (weightlifter) (born 1966), Swedish weightlifter
 Anna Bergström, Swedish curler
 Art Bergstrom (died 2006), American football player, coach, and collegiate athletic director
 Beata Bergström (1921–2016), Swedish photographer
 Bobo Bergström (born 1964), chef and restaurateur
 C. W. Bergstrom (born 1957), American professional wrestler
 Carl Bergstrom (born 1971), theoretical and evolutionary biologist and a professor
 Christian Bergström (born 1967), Swedish tennis player
 Cynthia Bergstrom, a costume designer
 Dana Bergstrom (born 1962), researcher at the Australian Antarctic Division
 Danelle Bergstrom (born 1957), Australian visual artist
  (born 1946), Swedish politician
 Dick Bergström (1886–1952), Swedish sailor who competed in the 1912 Summer Olympics
 Don Bergstrom (born 1945), American politician and educator
 E. Alexander Bergstrom (1919–1973), American ornithologist, editor, and conservationist
 Elaine Bergstrom, American author
 Emil Bergström (born 1993), Swedish footballer
 Erik Bergström (1886–1966), Swedish amateur football (soccer) player
 Fredrik Bergström (badminton) (born 1975), Swedish badminton player
 George Bergstrom (1876–1955), US architect
 Gösta Bergström (1903–1988), Swedish long-distance runner
 Gunilla Bergström (born 1942), Swedish writer
 Gustaf Bergström (1884–1938), Swedish footballer
 Hans Bergström (born 1948), Swedish-American journalist and political scientist
 Harald Bergström (1908–2001), Swedish mathematician, specializing in probability theory
 Harry Bergström (1910–1989), Finnish pianist, conductor, and composer
 Helena Bergström (born 1964), Swedish actress
 Hjalmar Bergström (1907–2000), Swedish skier
 James Bergstrom, American musician
 Jerri Bergström (born 1963), Swedish fencer
 John Bergstrom (born 1973), American music critic and journalist
 Jonas Bergström, Swedish lawyer
 Kajsa Bergström (born 1981), Swedish curler
 Karl Bergström (1937–2018), Swedish welterweight boxer
 Katie Bergstrom, former New York City Ballet dancer
 Kris Bergstrom (born 1976), North American taiko player
 Kristian Bergström (born 1974), retired Swedish footballer
 Kurt Bergström (1891–1955), Swedish ice hockey coach
 Lars Bergström (ice hockey) (born 1956), Swedish ice hockey manager
 Lars Bergström (philosopher), Swedish philosopher
 Lars Bergström (physicist) (born 1952), Swedish professor of theoretical physics
 Lena Bergström (born 1961), Swedish textiles and glass designer
 Malin Bergström, child psychologist and scientist
 Micheal Bergstrom (born 1957), Oklahoma State Senator
 Niklas Bergström (born 1974), Swedish sport shooter
 Nils Bergström (athlete) (1898–1988), Swedish long-distance runner
 Nils Bergström (bandy), Swedish bandy and football player
 Nils Bergström (ice hockey) (born 1985), Swedish ice hockey player
 Olof Bergström (1919–1984), Swedish actor
 Oscar Bergström (1903–1961), Swedish boxer
 Rex Bergstrom (1925–2005), New Zealand econometrician
 Robert W. Bergstrom (1918–2006), lawyer
 Roland Bergström, a Swedish football manager and player
 Rune Bergström (1891–1964), Swedish football player
 Sheldon Bergstrom, Canadian actor
 Stig Bergström (born 1935), Swedish-American paleontologist
 Stina Bergström (born 1958), Swedish politician
 Sune Bergström (1916–2004), Swedish biochemist
 Sven Bergström (born 1951), Swedish Centre Party politician
 Tony Bergstrom (born 1986), American footballer
 Torsten Bergström (1886–1948), Swedish director and actor
 Viktor Bergström (born 1986), Swedish speedway rider
 William Lee Bergstrom (1951–1985), American gambler

Places
 Bergstrom Air Force Base, military base seven miles southeast of Austin, Texas
 Austin–Bergstrom International Airport, Class C international airport in Austin, Texas

See also 
 Bergstrom Nutrition, a United States dietary supplement manufacturer
 People of Sweden
 Swedish language

Bergstrom